Theodore R. Boehm (born September 12, 1938) served as a justice of the Indiana Supreme Court.  Currently, he is a partner of Hoover Hull Turner LLP, an Indianapolis law firm.

Justice Boehm attended public schools in Indianapolis, Indiana.  He graduated from Brown University in 1960, summa cum laude, and from Harvard Law School in 1963, magna cum laude.  While attending Brown he joined the Delta Upsilon fraternity and was a member of Phi Beta Kappa.  At Harvard, he was an editor of the Harvard Law Review.  After graduating, Justice Boehm served as a law clerk to Chief Justice Earl Warren and retired Justices Stanley Reed and Harold Burton during the 1963 term of the United States Supreme Court.  In 1964, he joined the Indianapolis law firm of Baker & Daniels, where he became a partner in 1970 and managing partner in 1980.  He is a member of the American Law Institute.  After serving as a general counsel for General Electric and Eli Lilly and Company from 1988–95, he returned to Baker & Daniels before his appointment to the court.

Justice Boehm was appointed to the Indiana Supreme Court by then-Governor Evan Bayh on August 7, 1996. On November 4, 2008 the public voted to keep Boehm on the court in a statewide retention election. On May 25, 2010, Justice Boehm announced that he would retire from the Court on September 30, 2010. He then served as a Senior Judge for the Court of Appeals of Indiana from October 1, 2010 to December 30, 2010. Thereafter, Justice Boehm arbitrated and mediated complex business cases.

On March 16, 2015, Justice Boehm announced that he would join the law firm of Hoover Hull Turner LLP as a partner. There, he continues his alternative dispute resolution practice and advises clients on a wide range of legal issues and appellate practice.

Justice Boehm was Chairman and CEO of the organizing committee for the 1987 Pan American Games in Indianapolis, and was the first President and CEO of Indiana Sports Corporation, which staged the 1982 U.S. Olympic Festival. He was also President of the Penrod Society and one of the principal organizers of the Economic Club of Indianapolis.  He is a Trustee Emeritus of Brown University, a director of Metropolitan Indianapolis Public Broadcasting, Inc., Indiana Humanities, Inc., and The Economic Club of Indiana, Inc. He served on the Nominating and Governance Committee of the United States Olympic Committee 2003-10 (Chair 2003-07).  He was Co-Chair of the Organizing Committee for the 2002 FIBA World Championship in Indianapolis and was Chair of the Indianapolis Cultural Development Commission 2002-10.

See also 

 List of law clerks of the Supreme Court of the United States (Chief Justice)
 List of law clerks of the Supreme Court of the United States (Seat 6)
 List of law clerks of the Supreme Court of the United States (Seat 8)

References

External links
 Indiana Supreme Court official biography
 Findlaw.com listing
 Biography, Indianahumanities.org
 Indiana Supreme Court announcing Boehm's retirement

Living people
1938 births
Brown University alumni
Eli Lilly and Company people
Harvard Law School alumni
Justices of the Indiana Supreme Court
People from Indianapolis
Law clerks of the Supreme Court of the United States